The First Federal Electoral District of Colima (I Distrito Electoral Federal de Colima) is one of the 300 Electoral Districts into which Mexico is divided for the purpose of elections to the federal Chamber of Deputies and one of two such districts in the state of Colima.

It elects one deputy to the lower house of Congress for each three-year legislative period, by means of the first past the post system.

District territory
Under the 2005 districting scheme, the First  District of Colima covers the municipalities in the north and east part of the state:
Colima, Comala, Coquimatlán, Cuauhtémoc, Ixtlahuacán and Villa de Álvarez.

The district's head town (cabecera distrital), where results from individual polling stations are gathered together and collated, is the  state capital, the  city of Colima.

Previous districting schemes

1996–2005 district
Between 1996 and 2005, the district had the same composition as at present, with the exception of Ixtlahuacán, which belonged to the Second District

Deputies returned to Congress from this district

L Legislature
 1976–1979:  Ramón Serrano García (PRI)
LI Legislature
 1979–1982:  Agustín González Villalobos (PRI)
LII Legislature
 1982–1985:
LIII Legislature
 1985–1988:
LIV Legislature
 1988–1991:  Socorro Díaz Palacios (PRI)
LV Legislature
 1991–1994:  Rigoberto Salazar Velazco (PRI)
LVI Legislature
 1994–1997:  Ramona Carbajal Cárdenas (PRI)
LVII Legislature
 1997–2000:  José Adán Deniz Macías (PRI)
LVIII Legislature
 2000–2003:  Jesús Dueñas Llerenas (PAN)
LIX Legislature
 2003–2006:  Antonio Morales de la Peña (PAN)
LX Legislature
 2006–2009:  Esmeralda Cárdenas Sánchez (PAN)

References 

Federal electoral districts of Mexico
Politics of Colima